Brinkerhoff or Brinckerhoff may refer to:

People
Brinkerhoff (surname)

Places
Brinckerhoff, New York, a hamlet in Dutchess County, New York, United States.
The Brinkerhoff, a vacation lodge in Grand Teton National Park on the shore of Jackson Lake in Wyoming
Brinkerhoff Street Historic District, a district of residences in Plattsburgh, New York
Brinkerhoff Pond, in Bicknell, Wayne County, Utah

Historical houses
Brinkerhoff-Demarest House, a 1735 home in Teaneck, New Jersey
Storm-Adriance-Brinckerhoff House, an historic 1769 home in East Fishkill, Dutchess County, New York
Brinkerhoff Hill, in Madison County, New York
George M. Brinkerhoff House, a listing on the National Register of Historic Places in Sangamon County, Illinois
Romeyn-Oldis-Brinkerhoff House, a listing on the National Register of Historic Places in Bergen County, New Jersey
Brinkerhoff-Becker House, a listing on the National Register of Historic Places in Washtenaw County, Michigan

Others
Parsons Brinckerhoff, an engineering and construction management organization with 14,000 employees in 150 offices worldwide, founded in 1885 in New York City
Brinkerhoff Piano Company, an American brand of pianos and player pianos in the early 20th century